The 2007 National Assembly for Wales election was held on Thursday 3 May 2007 to elect members to the National Assembly for Wales. It was the third general election. On the same day local elections in England and Scotland, as well as the Scottish Parliament election took place. This election was preceded by the previous Assembly election in 2003.

The election saw Plaid Cymru make gains at the expense of Labour, although Labour remain the largest party in the Assembly, as they have since it began. Plaid stated they would make a referendum on devolving further powers to the National Assembly a condition for a coalition. Wales reported that senior civil servants before the election were preparing for three possible coalition administrations: Labour/Liberal Democrat, Labour/Plaid Cymru or Plaid Cymru/Liberal Democrat/Conservative.

Discussions between Plaid Cymru, the Conservatives and the Liberal Democrats to form a "Rainbow" Coalition broke down, and a coalition was eventually agreed between Labour and Plaid Cymru.

Major parties
The Welsh Labour Party before the election had 29 seats, Plaid Cymru had 12, the Welsh Conservative Party 11, the Welsh Liberal Democrats 6, Forward Wales 1, with 1 independent, Trish Law. Law had won her seat at a 2006 by-election. The one Forward Wales Assembly Member was elected as an independent before forming the party. The standings were otherwise identical to the 2003 results.

Electoral method
In general elections for the National Assembly for Wales, each voter has two votes in a mixed member system. The first vote may be used to vote for a candidate to become the Assembly Member for the voter's constituency, elected by the first past the post system. The second vote may be used to vote for a regional closed party list of candidates. Additional member seats are allocated from the lists by the d'Hondt method, with constituency results being taken into account in the allocation. The overall result is approximately proportional.

Pre-election forecasts

Predictions for the seat distribution were made by a number of polls before the election:

Electoral results

Overall turnout – 43.7%

|-
| style="background-color:white" colspan=15 | 
|-
!rowspan=3 colspan=2 | Parties
!colspan=10 | Additional member system
!rowspan=2 colspan=5 | Total seats
|-
!colspan=5 |Constituency
!colspan=5 |Region
|-
! Votes !! % !! +/− !! Seats !! +/− 
! Votes !! % !! +/− !! Seats !! +/−
! Total !! +/− !! %
|-

|-
|   || Total || 978,132 ||  ||  || 40 ||   || 974,884 ||  ||   || 20 ||  || 60 ||   ||
|}

(source:)

Votes summary

Constituency nominations
NB: candidates in BOLD text were incumbent assembly members before the election

 Trish Law has defended the seat she won in the 2006 by-election. Then and now, she is standing as an independent, but is affiliated with the Blaenau Gwent People's Voice Group.
 Ron Davies and John Marek stood as independents, but are members of and continue to play an active role in Forward Wales. Marek is the party's leader, while Davies is their Policy Director. Neither was elected on 3 May.

Regional lists

Mid and West Wales 

|-
! colspan=2 style="width: 200px"|Constituency
! style="width: 150px"|Elected member
! style="width: 300px"|Result
 
 
 
 
 
 
 
 
 

 RESULT: Labour – 2 seats; Plaid Cymru – 1 seat; Conservative – 1 seat

North Wales

 RESULT: Conservative – 2 seats; Plaid Cymru – 1 seat; LibDem – 1 seat

South Wales Central

 RESULT: Conservative – 2 seats; Plaid Cymru – 2 seats

South Wales East

 RESULT: Plaid Cymru – 2 seats; Conservative – 1 seat; LibDem – 1 seat
 Mohammad Asghar was the first ethnic minority member of the Assembly for Plaid Cymru but on 8 December 2009, he switched to the Conservatives
 Veronica German succeeded Mike German as the Liberal Democrat AM following his appointment to the House of Lords.

South Wales West

In South Wales West, there were also party lists from the Communist Party of Britain, Christian Peoples Alliance, Respect Party, Socialist Labour Party, Welsh Christian Party in addition to two independents, Keith James and John Hudson Jenkins.

New members
Thirteen of the members elected to the Assembly in the election were not members of the previous Assembly, including Gareth Jones, who sat in the Assembly from 1999 to 2003 and lost his seat in that year's election.

 Mohammad Asghar, Plaid Cymru, South Wales East
 Angela Burns, Welsh Conservative, Carmarthen West and South Pembrokeshire
 Alun Davies, Welsh Labour, Mid and West Wales
 Andrew R. T. Davies, Welsh Conservative, South Wales Central
 Paul Davies, Welsh Conservative, Preseli Pembrokeshire
 Nerys Evans, Plaid Cymru, Mid and West Wales
 Chris Franks, Plaid Cymru, South Wales Central
 Lesley Griffiths, Welsh Labour, Wrexham
 Bethan Jenkins, Plaid Cymru, South Wales West
 Gareth Jones, Plaid Cymru, Aberconwy (previously represented Conwy, 1999–2003)
 Darren Millar, Welsh Conservative, Clwyd West
 Nick Ramsay, Welsh Conservative, Monmouth
 Joyce Watson, Welsh Labour, Mid and West Wales

Defeated members
Nine sitting AMs were defeated at the polls.

Glyn Davies, Welsh Conservative, Mid and West Wales
Tamsin Dunwoody, Welsh Labour, Preseli Pembrokeshire
Lisa Francis, Welsh Conservative, Mid and West Wales
Christine Gwyther, Welsh Labour, Carmarthen West and South Pembrokeshire
Denise Idris Jones, Welsh Labour, Conwy (defeated in Aberconwy)
Laura Anne Jones, Welsh Conservative, South Wales East
John Marek, Independent, Wrexham
Alun Pugh, Welsh Labour, Clwyd West
Catherine Thomas, Welsh Labour, Llanelli

Retiring members
Four sitting AMs did not offer themselves for re-election.

David Davies, Welsh Conservative, Monmouth
Janet Davies, Plaid Cymru, South Wales West
Sue Essex, Welsh Labour, Cardiff North
Owen John Thomas, Plaid Cymru, South Wales Central

National election, 2003
Due to boundary changes, the composition of the outgoing Assembly did not reflect the Assembly that was elected in May 2003 (see National Assembly for Wales constituencies and electoral regions). The main changes were in northwestern Wales, where the constituencies of Conwy, Caernarfon, and Meirionydd nant Conwy were replaced by Aberconwy, Arfon and Dwyfor Meirionnydd.

See also
2007 Scottish Parliament election and 2007 United Kingdom local elections the same day
One Wales, the resultant coalition agreement.

Notes

External links
Results page from BBC News Online
 The Press Association's boundary change site
 Wales@Westminster newslog – BBC Wales' Parliamentary correspondent David Cornock's diary on political life
BBC Wales Politics page
Betsan Powys, BBC Wales' political editor, blogsite
Blamerbell Briefs (Welsh Assembly blogger)
Wales Elects blogsite

 
2007
May 2007 events in the United Kingdom